Thor's Cave (also known as Thor's House Cavern and Thyrsis's Cave) is a natural cavern located at  in the Manifold Valley of the White Peak in Staffordshire, England. It is classified as a karst cave. Located in a steep limestone crag, the cave entrance, a symmetrical arch 7.5 metres wide and 10 metres high, is prominently visible from the valley bottom, around 80 metres (260 feet) below. Reached by an easy stepped path from the Manifold Way, the cave is a popular tourist spot, with views over the Manifold Valley. The second entrance is known as the "West Window", below which is a second cave, Thor's Fissure Cavern.

Thor's Cave was served by a railway station on the Leek and Manifold Valley Light Railway from 1904 to 1934; the disused line now forms the Manifold Way.

Etymology
The origin of the name is uncertain, possibly from the word "tor". Links with the Norse god Thor and the Germanic paganism of the early Anglo-Saxons in general have been suggested, but evidence is lacking. Other hypotheses have included lost ancient dialectal terms, and obscure English saints.

Human habitation
Excavations in 1864–65 and 1927–35 found human and animal remains, stone tools, pottery, amber beads, and bronze items within Thor's Cave and the adjacent Thor's Fissure Cavern. The caves are estimated to have contained the burial sites of at least seven people. The finds suggest the cavern was occupied from the end of the Palaeolithic period, with more intensive use during the Iron Age and Roman periods.

Rock climbing
Thor's Cave has been used by rock climbers since explorations in the early 1950s by Joe Brown and others. Eleven limestone routes are listed by the BMC, ranging in grade from Very Severe to E7, and several more have been claimed since guidebook publication; a few routes are bolted.

Media use
The cave was used to represent the entrance to the Dark Wizard's lair in the 1980 film Hawk the Slayer, directed by Terry Marcel, and was a location in The Lair of the White Worm (1988), directed by Ken Russell and starring Hugh Grant.

It was used in the filming of The Verve's 1993 video for their single "Blue", and is also pictured on the front cover of the band's first album, A Storm in Heaven. The cave also acts as the backdrop for Winterfylleth's band photo for their 2020 album The Reckoning Dawn.

See also
 Beeston Tor
 Ecton
 Grindon
 Wetton

Notes

References

External links

"Rockfax: Thor's cave" (climbing guide)
"Vintage footage of Thor's cave filmed from the now defunct Leek and Manifold Light Railway"

Caves of Staffordshire
Climbing areas of England
Mountains and hills of the Peak District
Iron Age sites in England
Roman sites in England
Stone Age sites in England
Archaeological sites in Staffordshire
Bronze Age sites in Staffordshire